Jayadev Misra is an Indian-born computer scientist who has spent most of his professional career in the United States. He is the Schlumberger Centennial Chair Emeritus in computer science and a University Distinguished Teaching Professor Emeritus at the University of Texas at Austin. Professionally he is known for his contributions to the formal aspects of concurrent programming and for jointly spearheading, with Sir Tony Hoare, the project on Verified Software Initiative (VSI).

Education and early career
Misra received a B.Tech. in electrical engineering from IIT Kanpur, India in 1969 and a Ph.D. in electrical engineering and computer science from the Johns Hopkins University, Baltimore, Maryland in 1972. After a brief period working for IBM, he joined the University of Texas at Austin in 1974 where he has remained throughout his career, except for a sabbatical year spent at Stanford University during 1983–1984. He retired from active teaching in 2015.

Major professional contributions
Misra and K. Mani Chandy have made a number of important contributions in the area of concurrent computing. They developed a
programming notation and a logic, called UNITY, to describe concurrent computations. Leslie Lamport says: "The first major step in getting beyond traditional programming languages to describe concurrent algorithms was Misra and Chandy's Unity" and
"Misra and Chandy developed proof rules to formalize the style of reasoning that had been developed for proving invariance and leads-to properties. Unity provided the most elegant formulation yet for these proofs."

Misra and Chandy (and, independently, Randy Bryant) have developed a conservative algorithm for distributed discrete-event simulation, which is now commonly used in a variety of areas. They also developed a number of fundamental algorithms for resource allocation (the drinking philosophers problem), deadlock detection, graph algorithms, and a theory of knowledge transmission in distributed systems. In collaboration with David Gries, Misra proposed the first algorithm for the heavy-hitters problem. Misra proposed a set of axioms for concurrent memory access that underlie the theory of linearizability.

Misra's most recent research project, called Orc, attempts to develop an algebra of concurrent computing that will help integrate different pieces of software for concurrent execution.

Awards and honors
 Member, National Academy of Engineering, 2018. 
 Harry H. Goode Memorial Award, IEEE, 2017.
 Doctor Honoris Causa, École normale supérieure Paris-Saclay, Cachan, France, 2010.
 Guggenheim Fellowship, 1988.
 Identified as a "highly cited researcher"" by Thomson Reuters ISI, 2004.
 ACM Fellow, 1995.
 IEEE Fellow, 1992.
 Distinguished alumnus, IIT Kanpur, India, 
 Member, TAMEST (The Academy of Medicine, Engineering and Science of Texas), 2018.

Selected publications
 Effective Theories in Programming Practice, ACM Books, 2023
 Parallel Program Design - a Foundation (with K.M. Chandy), 1988
 Distributed discrete-event simulation, 1986
 Proofs of networks of processes (with K.M. Chandy), 1981
 Distributed deadlock detection (with K.M. Chandy and Laura M. Haas), 1983
 The drinking philosophers problem (with K.M. Chandy), 1984
 Finding repeated elements (with D. Gries), 1982
 How processes learn (with K.M. Chandy), 1985
 The Orc Programming Language (with D. Kitchin, A. Quark, and W. Cook), 2009
 Axioms for memory access in asynchronous hardware systems, 1986
 Powerlist: A structure for parallel recursion, 1994
 Verified Software: Theories, Tools, Experiments Vision of a Grand Challenge Project (with Tony Hoare), 2008

References

Living people
University of Texas at Austin faculty
American computer scientists
Indian computer scientists
Johns Hopkins University alumni
1947 births